Jean-Christophe Valtat, born 1968, is a French writer and teacher. He was educated at École Normale Supérieure and the University of Paris III: Sorbonne Nouvelle. He has taught Comparative Literature at Blaise Pascal University in Clermont-Ferrand, and at Paul Valéry University in Montpellier, France, where he researches romantic, modern and contemporary literature, and the relationships between literature, science, technology and the media.

He is the author of the steampunk novels Aurorarama (2010), and Luminous Chaos (2013) published by Melville House. Aurorarama was short-listed for a Red Tentacle Kitschie in 2010, and nominated for the John W. Campbell Memorial Award for Best Science Fiction Novel in 2011.  He also authored two other novels, Exes, and 03, which famous literary critic James Wood picked as one of the best books of 2010, published by Farrar, Straus and Giroux, and a book of short stories, Album. He has also written the award-winning radio play La vie inimitable and a movie Augustine (2003), which he also co-directed.

Notes

Published reviews
 

1968 births
Living people
French male writers